Ludwig II (1845–1886) was King of Bavaria from 1864 to 1886.

Ludwig II may also refer to:

People
 Louis the German (806–876), called Ludwig II der Deutsche
 Ludwig II, Count of Württemberg (1137–1181)
 Louis II, Duke of Bavaria (1229–1294)
 Ludwig II, Count of Württemberg-Urach (1439–1457)

Art and entertainment
 Ludwig II (sculpture), an 1870 sculpture by Elisabet Ney
 Ludwig II (1922 film), a silent Austrian film directed by Otto Kreisler and starring Olaf Fjord as Ludwig
 Ludwig II, King of Bavaria (1929), a late German silent film directed by and starring William Dieterle
 Ludwig II (1955 film), a 1955 West German film
 Ludwig (film), a 1972 film about Ludwig II written and directed by Luchino Visconti and starring Helmut Berger as Ludwig
 Ludwig II (musical) (2000), a German musical
 Ludwig II (manga), a boys love manga depicting a fictionalized story about the king
 Ludwig II (2012 film)

See also
 Louis II (disambiguation)

Human name disambiguation pages